Thrikkaipatta  is a village in Wayanad district in the state of Kerala, India Wayanad District is a district in the north-east of Kerala state, India with headquarters at the town of Kalpetta.

History
The district was formed on 1 November 1980 as the 12th district in Kerala by carving out areas from Kozhikode and Kannur districts. 

The region was known as Mayakshetra (Maya's land) in the earliest records. Mayakshetra evolved into Mayanad and finally to Wayanad. The Folk etymology of the word says it is a combination of Vayal (paddy field) and Naad (land), making it 'The Land of Paddy Fields'. There are many indigenous tribals in this area.

Geography
It is set high on the Western Ghats with altitudes ranging from 700 to 2100 m.

It is the least populous district in Kerala.

Unlike all other 13 districts of Kerala, in Wayanad district, there is no town or village named same as the district (i.e., there is no "Wayanad town").

Wayanad is the only district in Kerala that shares border with both the neighboring states Karnataka and Tamil Nadu. Wayanad shares border with Kozhikode, Kannur, and Malappuram districts in Kerala; Nilgiris district in Tamil Nadu; and Chamarajanagar, Mysore, and Kodagu (Coorg) districts in Karnataka.

Demographics
 India census, Thrikkaipatta (Village) had a population of 10384 with 5210 males and 5174 females.

Transportation
Thrikkaipattais 70 km by road from Kozhikode railway station and this road includes nine hairpin bends. The nearest major airport is at Calicut. The road to the east connects to Mysore and Bangalore. Night journey is allowed on this sector as it goes through Bandipur national forest. The nearest railway station is Mysore.  There are airports at Bangalore and Calicut.

References

Villages in Wayanad district
Kalpetta area